Wim Mennes (born 25 January 1977 in Lommel, Belgium) is a professional football (soccer) midfielder, who plays for KFC Oosterzonen.

References
 Guardian Football Stats
 Wim Mennes at Footballdatabase

Belgian footballers
1977 births
Living people
People from Lommel
K.V.C. Westerlo players
Sint-Truidense V.V. players
K.F.C. Lommel S.K. players
Challenger Pro League players
Belgian Pro League players
Association football midfielders
Footballers from Limburg (Belgium)